Nozomi Kawahara (born 16 July 1970) is a Japanese professional golfer.

Kawahara plays on the Japan Golf Tour, where he has won once.

Professional wins (1)

Japan Golf Tour wins (1)

Japan Golf Tour playoff record (0–1)

External links

Japanese male golfers
Japan Golf Tour golfers
Sportspeople from Kanagawa Prefecture
1970 births
Living people